Nowshera (with alternative spellings Nowshehra and Naushera) may refer to:

Places

India
 Nowshera, Jammu and Kashmir, a town and tehsil in Rajauri district in the Indian-administered Jammu and Kashmir
 Nowshera, Srinagar, a notified area in Srinagar, Jammu and Kashmir, India
 Naushera, Budaun, a village in Uttar Pradesh

Iran
 Nowshahr, a port city in the province of Mazandaran in northern Iran
 Noshahr County, a county in Mazandaran Province in Iran. The capital of the county is Noshahr

Pakistan
 Naushera, Punjab, a town and Tehsil of Khushab District in Punjab
 Nowshera Virkan, a town and Tehsil of Gujranwala District in Punjab 
 Nowshera District, Khyber Pakhtunkhwa province
 Nowshera, Khyber Pakhtunkhwa, a city in Nowshera district
 Nowshera Cantonment, a cantonment adjacent to Nowshera
 Nowshera Tehsil
 Rahim Yar Khan District, known until 1881 as "Naushehra"

See also
 Nowshera Brigade, an Infantry formation of the Indian Army during World War II
 Battle of Nowshera, a battle was fought in March 1823 between the forces of Pashtun tribesmen against the Army of Maharaja Ranjit Singh
 Naushehra Pannuan, a village in Punjab, India